Hemiaulaceae is a diatom family.  Species live between -1.86 and 29.47 degrees Celsius and at depths of up to 2010 meters.

See also
Coscinodiscineae

References

Coscinodiscophyceae
Diatom families